Alain Andji (born 20 November 1974 in Treichville, Ivory Coast) is a French pole vaulter. He changed nationality from his birth country Ivory Coast.

Andji finished eighth at the 1996 European Indoor Championships, ninth at the 1996 Olympic Games, eleventh at the 1997 World Indoor Championships and first at the 1997 Mediterranean Games.

Before switching to France he set an Ivory Coast national record of 5.10 metres in June 1992 in Yerres. His career best jump was 5.85 metres, achieved in May 1997 in Bonneuil-sur-Marne.

Competition record

See also
 French all-time top lists - Pole vault

References

External links
 

1974 births
Living people
Sportspeople from Abidjan
French male pole vaulters
Ivorian pole vaulters
Ivorian male athletes
Olympic athletes of France
Athletes (track and field) at the 1996 Summer Olympics
World Athletics Championships athletes for France
Ivorian emigrants to France
Mediterranean Games gold medalists for France
Athletes (track and field) at the 1997 Mediterranean Games
Mediterranean Games medalists in athletics
20th-century French people